The 1982–83 season was Colchester United's 41st season in their history and second consecutive season in fourth tier of English football, the Fourth Division. Alongside competing in the Fourth Division, the club also participated in the FA Cup, the League Cup and the Football League Trophy.

Colchester challenged for the top four but once again fell short, on this occasion missing promotion by just two points. A tragic season saw forward John Lyons take his own life, while Allan Hunter resigned two months later, replaced by his assistant Cyril Lea in February.

In the cups, Colchester were entered into the second and final iteration of the Football League Trophy, which the U's exited at the group stage, which defeats to Southampton and Torquay United in the second and first round of the League and FA Cup respectively denied the club a cup run.

Season overview
Allan Hunter continued in his role as player-manager for the new season, with former Ipswich Town coach Cyril Lea his assistant. Colchester led the table undefeated after seven games and earned a League Cup second round tie against Southampton. Following a 0–0 draw at Layer Road, with England international Peter Shilton in inspired form, the U's could not repeat their heroics from 1974 at The Dell, losing 4–2 and making another early exit.

The season then took a tragic turn, when in November, just hours after turning out for the U's against Chester City, forward John Lyons committed suicide at his home in Layer de la Haye. After this incident and having to give up his own playing career, Allan Hunter resigned as manager in January with Colchester in seventh place. Cyril Lea took over initially until the end of the campaign and promptly won eight of his first eleven games. However, four defeats in 17 days during April cost the U's and they finished sixth position in the league, missing promotion by just two points.

Ian Allinson ended the season as Colchester's top scorer with 26 league and cup goals, while youth graduate Tony Adcock scored 17 goals. Veteran goalkeeper Mike Walker, who had missed just nine games in ten seasons for the club, announced his retirement at the end of the season.

Players

Transfers

In

 Total spending:  ~ £10,000

Out

 Total incoming:  ~ £25,000

Loans in

Loans out

Match details

Fourth Division

Results round by round

League table

Matches

Football League Trophy

League Cup

FA Cup

Squad statistics

Appearances and goals

|-
!colspan="16"|Players who appeared for Colchester who left during the season

|}

Goalscorers

Disciplinary record

Clean sheets
Number of games goalkeepers kept a clean sheet.

Player debuts
Players making their first-team Colchester United debut in a fully competitive match.

See also
List of Colchester United F.C. seasons

References

General
Books

Websites

Specific

1982-83
English football clubs 1982–83 season